Neocollyris dimidiata is a species of ground beetle in the genus Neocollyris in the family Carabidae. It was described by Chaudoir in 1864.

References

Dimidiata, Neocollyris
Beetles described in 1864